Laterna magica may refer to:

 Laterna Magika, a theater in Prague
 Laterna Magica (book), by Ingmar Bergman
 Laterna Magica (composition), a composition by Kaija Saariaho

See also
Magic Lantern (disambiguation)